Timothy Aaron Lopes (born June 24, 1994) is an American professional baseball infielder in the San Diego Padres organization. He has played in Major League baseball (MLB) for the Seattle Mariners and Milwaukee Brewers.

Professional career

Seattle Mariners
Lopes attended Edison High School in Huntington Beach, California. Lopes was drafted by the Seattle Mariners in the 6th round, with the 191st overall selection, of the 2012 Major League Baseball draft.

Lopes split the 2012 season between the Arizona League Mariners and the High Desert Mavericks, hitting a combined .313/.375/.476/.851 with 33 RBI. He spent the 2013 season with the Clinton LumberKings, hitting .272/.315/.344/.659 with 1 home run and 33 RBI. His 2014 season was spent with High Desert, hitting .238/.308/.337/.645 with 4 home runs and 44 RBI. He spent the 2015 season with the Bakersfield Blaze, hitting .276/.340/.362/.702 with 2 home runs and 49 RBI. He spent the 2016 season with the Jackson Generals, hitting .284/.358/.355/.713 with 1 home run and 49 RBI.

Toronto Blue Jays
On September 30, 2016, Lopes was traded to the Toronto Blue Jays as the PTBNL in a trade in exchange for Pat Venditte. Lopes spent the 2017 season with the New Hampshire Fisher Cats, hitting .271/.338/.390/.728 with 7 home runs and 50 RBI. He spent the 2018 season with the Buffalo Bisons, hitting .277/.325/.364/.689 with 2 home runs and 29 RBI.

Second Stint with Mariners
Lopes signed a minor league contract to return to the Seattle Mariners on November 14, 2018. He opened the 2019 season with the Tacoma Rainiers.

On July 23, 2019, the Mariners selected Lopes' contract and promoted him to the major leagues. He made his debut on July 24, as a ninth inning defensive replacement at second base. He was placed on the 7-day concussion injured list on July 26, after being struck in the helmet by a Drew VerHagen fastball on July 25. After spending the next 11 days on the concussion list, Lopes hit his first major league home run off Adrián Morejón of the San Diego Padres on August 6.

In 2020, Lopes hit .238 with 2 home runs and 15 RBI in 46 games. On December 18, 2020, Lopes was designated for assignment by the Mariners after the signing of Chris Flexen was made official.

Milwaukee Brewers
On December 22, 2020, Lopes was claimed off waivers by the Milwaukee Brewers. On March 8, 2021, Lopes was placed on the 60-day injured list due to a right oblique strain. On May 31, Lopes was activated off of the injured list and optioned to the Triple-A Nashville Sounds. Lopes was designated for assignment by the Brewers on September 29, 2021. Lopes became a free agent following the season.

Colorado Rockies
On December 17, 2021, Lopes signed a minor league contract with the Colorado Rockies. He elected free agency on November 10, 2022.

San Diego Padres
On December 20, 2022, Lopes signed a minor league deal with the San Diego Padres.

Personal life
Lopes is a Christian. Lopes is married to Amber Lopes. They have one daughter together.

Lopes' brother, Christian Lopes, is also a professional baseball player.

Lopes is a supporter of Compassion International.

References

External links

1994 births
Living people
American sportspeople of Brazilian descent
Baseball players from Los Angeles
Major League Baseball infielders
Seattle Mariners players
Milwaukee Brewers players
Arizona League Mariners players
Clinton LumberKings players
High Desert Mavericks players
Bakersfield Blaze players
Jackson Generals (Southern League) players
New Hampshire Fisher Cats players
Buffalo Bisons (minor league) players
Tacoma Rainiers players
Nashville Sounds players